Zaszczytowo  (German: Saratoga) is a village in the administrative district of Gmina Krzeszyce, within Sulęcin County, Lubusz Voivodeship, in western Poland.

The village has a population of 160.

References

Zaszczytowo